The Men's under-23 road race of the 2021 UCI Road World Championships was a cycling event that took place on 24 September 2021 from Antwerp to Leuven, Belgium. It was the 25th edition of the event. The race was won by Italian rider Filippo Baroncini, finishing two seconds ahead of the bunch sprint for silver, won by Biniam Girmay of Eritrea.

American rider Luke Lamperti originally finished 10th, but was disqualified after the race by the UCI jury after allegedly causing a Belgian rider to crash earlier in the race.

Final classification

References

Men's under-23 road race
UCI Road World Championships – Men's under-23 road race
2021 in men's road cycling